These are the official results of the Men's long jump event at the 1990 European Championships in Split, Yugoslavia, held at Stadion Poljud on  29 and 30 August 1990.  There were a total number of 22 participating athletes.

Medalists

Results

Final
30 August

†: Bronze medalist Borut Bilač from Yugoslavia was initially disqualified for a suspected infringement of IAAF doping rules, but was later cleared of the charges and reinstated.

Qualification
29 August

Group A

Group B

Participation
According to an unofficial count, 22 athletes from 14 countries participated in the event.

 (1)
 (1)
 (2)
 (1)
 (1)
 (3)
 (1)
 (1)
 (1)
 (2)
 (1)
 (2)
 (2)
 (3)

See also
 1988 Men's Olympic Long Jump (Seoul)
 1990 Long Jump Year Ranking
 1991 Men's World Championships Long Jump (Tokyo)
 1992 Men's Olympic Long Jump (Barcelona)
 1994 Men's European Championships Long Jump (Helsinki)

References

 Results

Long jump
Long jump at the European Athletics Championships